HC Merano is an ice hockey team in Merano, Italy. They play in the Alps Hockey League

History
Merano was founded in 1968. They won the Serie A twice, in 1986 and 1999. Since 2004 the club is playing in the 2nd highest league in Italy.

Honours
Serie A champion : 1986, 1999
Serie A2 champion: 1971, 1978, 1991
Serie B champion: 2016
Serie C champion: 2009

Notable players
 Rick Morocco

References

External links
Official website

Ice hockey clubs established in 1968
Ice hockey teams in Italy
Alpenliga teams
Inter-National League teams
Merano
Sport in South Tyrol
1968 establishments in Italy